The Bedford QL was a series of trucks, manufactured by Bedford for use by the British Armed Forces in the Second World War.

History

At the outbreak of WW II, Bedford was contracted by the British War Office to produce a 3 ton 4×4 general service truck. A pilot model was ready in February 1940 and quantity production started in March 1941. The Bedford QL was in production from 1941 to 1945 and was Bedford's first vehicle series built for the military.

Variants

QL1 
Prototype.
QLB 
Bofors gun tractor. Approximately 5,500 QLBs were built.
Several QLBs were fitted with shortened GS bodies and recovery cranes to be used as wreckers by the Danish Army (Used until late 1960s).
QLC 
Fire engine.
Signals vehicle.
Petrol tanker.
QLD 
General service cargo truck and was the most numerous version in the series.
Machinery.
Kitchen.
Battery storage.
QLR 
Signals vehicle. Originally mounted on the QLC chassis/cab, special QLR chassis were soon put into production, which differed from the standard type in having special electrical equipment, radio suppression, fitment of a 660 W auxiliary generator driven by the transfer case power-take-off and, like the QLT, two 16 gallon petrol tanks instead of one behind the cab. The interior furniture, partitioning and radio equipment varied from the different functions. On vehicles installed for the wireless role, a tent could be erected at the rear. Between cab and man body were lockers for aerial masts and other equipment. Beneath the body were further lockers and racks for cable drums, batteries, tyre chains, 20 gallon drinking water tank, rectifier box, tools, fuel tank for the auxiliary engine, jerrycans and other items. The basic body shells were produced by Duple, Lagonda, Mulliner, Tickford and others. A revised body was introduced during 1944 for the Command High and Low Power and Wireless High Power roles. This body had an improved "L"-shaped tent which could be erected alongside the left-hand side and rear of the body.
QLT 
Troop carrier. From August 1941 and until the end of WW II more than 3,300 QLTs were produced.
QLW 
Air portable tipper.

Lorry, 3 ton, GS Bedford half-track (Bedford-Bren - prototype only) 
Following the fall of Singapore rubber was scarce and so at the request of the Ministry of Supply a Bedford QL was adapted using a Carden Lloyd suspension taken from a Bren Gun Carrier. While the Bedford-Bren was capable of impressive feats of tractive power (which could have been easily produced in its own right as a prime mover) British authorities, unlike the Americans and Germans, did not favour the half-track. The shortage of rubber was not as severe as anticipated and official interest in the project waned. Not only did this British parallel to the German Maultier not go into production, the single prototype was converted back into an all-wheel vehicle.

Lorry, 3 ton, 4 x 4, Bedford, experimental (Bedford Giraffe - prototype only) 
An attempt to make a motor vehicle capable of deep wading for river crossings and amphibious landing, the Bedford Giraffe was developed as insurance against the shallow wading kits under development not proving effective in deeper water. As a 'plan B' Vauxhall adapted a Bedford GL by mounting its engine, cab and gearbox on an elevated girder frame some seven feet high, with a chain drive transmitting power to the propshaft. The ungainly but effective vehicle demonstrated it was a viable solution should hastily extemporised waterproofing kits fail but they proved effective and so no specialised type was required.

References

Citations

Bibliography

 Bart Vanderveen (1989) 'Historic Military Vehicles Directory'

External links

Military trucks of the United Kingdom
Off-road vehicles
World War II vehicles of the United Kingdom
Soft-skinned vehicles
Military vehicles introduced from 1940 to 1944
QL